Mudkhed is a city and a municipal council in Nanded District in the Indian state of Maharashtra. well known for Flower merchants.

Transport 
Mudkhed Junction as in 2010 is the junction of three railway lines.  A Broad gauge line goes to Mumbai, a Broad gauge line to be  goes to Nagpur, and another broad gauge line goes to Secunderabad.

Mudked is located  towards east from district headquarters Nanded.  from State capital Mumbai towards west.

CRPF Training College, Mudkhed was established in September 1996 by Shankarrao Chavan.

Mudkhed Taluka
Mudkhed taluka pin code 431806 consists of 65 Villages and 51 Panchayats. Amrapur (Dudhanwadi) is the smallest Village and Barad is the biggest Village.
More than 100,000 people living in 16,586 Houses in Mudkhed taluka of 65 villages while Mudkhed town has around 25,000 population.

Different flowers are grown in Mudkhed, including Rose, Mogra, and Kakda. it also has bananas and sugarcane. it has a municipal council of total 18 members including President Mujeeb Ahmed Ameeruddin Ansari and Chief Officer Ramraje Kapre.

Shri. Dinesh Zample is current Tahsildar.

See also
 Mukhed

References 

Cities and towns in Nanded district